The Franklin and Armfield Office, which houses the Freedom House Museum, is a historic commercial building in Alexandria, Virginia (until 1846, the District of Columbia). Built c. 1810–1820, it was first used as a private residence before being converted to the offices of the largest slave trading firm in the United States, started in 1828 by Isaac Franklin and John Armfield. "As many as [a] million people are thought to have passed through between 1828 and 1861, on their way to bondage in Mississippi and Louisiana". Another source, using ship manifests (lists of slaves) in the National Archives, gives the number as "at least 5,000".

The former Franklin & Armfield Office building is located just west of Alexandria's Old Town, on the north side of Duke Street between South West and South Payne streets.  It is a three-story brick building, topped by a mansard roof and resting on a brick foundation. Its front facade is laid in Flemish bond, while the sides and rear are laid in common bond. It has Federal-period styling, with windows and the entrance door set in segmented, arch openings, with gabled dormers at the roof level.

The building was designated a National Historic Landmark in 1978, and has also been designated a Virginia Historic Landmark. The building was formerly owned by the Northern Virginia Urban League which operated it as a museum, with exhibits about the slave trading firm and the life of a slave. 

The City of Alexandria purchased the building in March of 2020 and reopened it as a museum in June of 2022.

History
The building was constructed as a residence in the 1810s by Robert Young, a brigadier general in the District of Columbia Militia.  Due to financial reverses, Young was soon afterward forced to sell the house.

Franklin & Armfield
The building was purchased in 1828 by Isaac Franklin and his intimate friend and  nephew-by-marriage John Armfield, who established it as their Washington-area office, and the residence of Armfield.

The property then extended further east, and they added structures for holding and trading in slaves. They also provided, for 25¢ a day, housing in their jail for slaveowners visiting Washington. The two-story extension to the rear of this house was part of the slave-holding facilities, which included high walls, and interior chambers that featured prison-like grated doors and windows. Franklin left the business, starting in 1835, and Armfield sold the property to another slave trader in 1836.

Franklin and Armfield sold more enslaved people, separated more families, and made more money from the trade than almost anyone else in America. They amassed a fortune equalling billions in today's dollars (2021) and were two of the nation's richest men. Franklin sold slaves from an office in Natchez, Mississippi, with branch offices in New Orleans, St. Francisville, and Vidalia, Louisiana. His nephew Armfield handled the supply, sending agents door-to-door in Virginia, Maryland, and Delaware looking for enslaved people their owners might like to sell, and arranging transportation.

Maryland and Virginia had surpluses of slaves and spoke of slaves as an export, like livestock. As portrayed in Uncle Tom's Cabin, there was a vast, internal forced migration of enslaved people from the Upper South to the Lower South, and Franklin and Armfield were central to that business. "In surviving correspondence, they actually brag about raping enslaved people who they’ve been processing through the firm."

Price, Birch and Co.

From 1858, the building was occupied by Price, Birch & Co. an American slave trading company founded in 1858 by George Kephart, William Birch, J. C. Cook, and C. M. Price.

Price, Birch & Co. ceased business in 1861. Arriving at the Duke street office of the company on May 14, 1861, the Union Army discovered that "The firm had fled, and taken with them all but one of the humans that they sold as slaves — an old man, chained to the middle of the floor by the leg." Union forces then took possession of the building until February 2, 1866, using it as a military prison. Late in the war, it was used as L'Ouverture Hospital for black soldiers, and as housing for contrabands.

Use after the Civil War
After the war, the building's outlying slave pens, of which there are photographs, were torn down. The bricks may have been reused in the construction of the adjacent townhouses. After serving a variety of other uses, the main building is now used for Freedom House Museum, with exhibits devoted to the slave trade. The second floor houses the offices of the Northern Virginia Urban League.

In 2005, the Virginia Department of Historic Resources erected the following marker in front of the building:

Isaac Franklin and John Armfield leased this brick building with access to the wharves and docks in 1828 as a holding pen for enslaved people being shipped from northern Virginia to Louisiana. They purchased the building and three lots in 1832. From this location Armfield bought bondspeople at low prices and shipped them south to his partner Franklin, in Natchez, Mississippi, and New Orleans, Louisiana, to be sold at higher prices. By the 1830s they often sold 1,000 people annually, operating as one of the largest slave-trading companies in the United States until 1836. Slave traders continually owned the property until 1861.

Freedom House Museum 
The Northern Virginia Urban League purchased the building in the 1990s and installed an exhibit in the basement. The rest of the building was used for offices and classroom space.

The Office of Historic Alexandria partnered with the Northern Virginia Urban League in February of 2018 in an effort to maintain and interpret the building. The Urban League received $50,000 from the National Trust for Historic Preservation's African American Cultural Heritage Action Fund that same year.

The City of Alexandria purchased the building from the Urban League in March of 2020.

The Freedom House Museum reopened in June of 2022. It houses three exhibits that tell the story of the Black experience in Alexandria and the United States.

See also

 Alexandria Black History Museum
 Contrabands and Freedmen Cemetery
 List of National Historic Landmarks in Virginia
 Lumpkin's Jail
 National Register of Historic Places listings in Alexandria, Virginia
 Domestic slave trade

References

Further reading

External links

 City of Alexandria: Freedom House Museum 
 Northern Virginia Urban League: Freedom House Museum
 Freedom House Museum official Web page

Houses on the National Register of Historic Places in Virginia
National Historic Landmarks in Virginia
American Civil War prison camps
Federal architecture in Virginia
Houses in Alexandria, Virginia
Commercial buildings completed in 1820
National Register of Historic Places in Alexandria, Virginia
1828 establishments in Washington, D.C.
Museums in Alexandria, Virginia
History museums in Virginia
African-American museums in Virginia
American slave traders
African-American history of Virginia
Buildings and structures in Alexandria, Virginia
Virginia Historic Landmarks
History of slavery in Virginia
Slavery in the United States
History of the District of Columbia
Slave pens